North Korea–Turkey relations (Korean:뛰르끼예-조선민주주의 인민공화국 관계) are the foreign relations between North Korea and Turkey. The Turkish ambassador in Seoul is accredited to North Korea. North Korea's ambassador in Sofia, Bulgaria is accredited to Turkey.

Diplomatic relations 

Until 2001, North Korea's post-World War II policy toward Turkey was mainly aimed at minimizing cooperation between Turkey and South Korea. In a quest to end its diplomatic and economic isolation, North Korea established diplomatic relations on June 27, 2001.

When the Bush administration determined that North Korea was in violation of the 1994 agreement on North Korea's nuclear weapons program, bilateral relations between the two nations have been very limited.

Economic relations 

Trade volume between the two countries was negligible in 2019.

See also 

 Foreign relations of North Korea
 Foreign relations of Turkey
 South Korea–Turkey relations

References 

 
Turkey
Bilateral relations of Turkey